Senegal competed at the 2007 World Championships in Athletics.

Competitors 

Nations at the 2007 World Championships in Athletics
World Championships in Athletics
Senegal at the World Championships in Athletics